The Waterhouses branch line was a railway built by the North Staffordshire Railway to link the small villages east of Leek, Staffordshire with Leek, the biggest market town in the area.  The railway opened in 1905 but closed to passengers in 1935.  Freight continued on the line though until 1988, when the line was mothballed as the traffic from the quarries at Caldon Low ceased.

In 2009 a new company, Moorlands & City Railways (MCR), was formed with the intention of re-opening the line for commercial freight traffic, and contracted with the local Churnet Valley Railway (CVR) to hold a series of re-opening events in November 2010. Since 2011 an agreement has been reached between the two companies that sees the CVR operate a heritage service along the branch, with MCR continuing negotiations over the return of freight traffic.

History
The history of the branch is closely linked with the history of the Leek and Manifold Valley Light Railway (LMVLR) as they were part of same proposal to bring the railways to this rural part of Staffordshire, although the promoters of the scheme and the NSR had different motives.

The area east of Leek was (and still is) a rural area consisting of upland hill farms, open moorland interspersed with small villages in the valleys of the rivers Hamps and Manifold. The railways had bypassed such areas as being uneconomic to build into but with the passing of the Light Railways Act 1896 the way was opened for railways to be constructed in rural areas at cheaper cost and with the possibility of financial support from the Treasury. Even as the Light Railways Act was progressing through Parliament a committee was formed in Leek to promote a light railway from Leek to Hartington in Dovedale, Derbyshire. In order to access Treasury funds the line had to be constructed and operated by an existing railway company and as the NSR had a monopoly on rail traffic in the area, the committee entered into discussion with the NSR board in August 1896. The NSR were not only interested in the traffic to be generated from the area but also because it saw the advantage in using a line under the Light Railways Act as a means of building a standard gauge line to the quarries at Caldon Low.

As the main objective of the NSR was to improve its mineral traffic from Caldon Low, the company did not view a link with Leek as a high priority and for a considerable time there was disagreement between the railway company, the promoters of the LMVLR and the people of Leek over whether to build a direct route from Leek to Waterhouses (the Leek curve), as the people of Leek wanted, or solely to build a curve away from Leek towards Stoke, as the railway company wanted.  It took two years for the light railway order to be approved and the single line branch was not authorised until 1 March 1899 by the Leek, Caldon Low, and Hartington Light Railways Order 1898.  This order did not include the Leek curve at Leek Brook, and it took a further Act of Parliament, the North Staffordshire Railway Act 1899 (62 & 63 Vict. c.ccxxxi) to give the NSR the authority to build the Leek curve.

Construction

The light railway order authorised the constructionm of four lines:
the line from Leek Brook junction to Caldon (length )
the line from Caldon into Caldon Low quarry (length )
the line from Caldon to Waterhouses (length )
the LMVLR (length )
Very soon after the passing of the order the ceremonial sod-cutting took place and was conducted by the 8th Duke of Devonshire on 3 October 1899 at Waterhouses.

Surveying, planning and purchasing the land took two years and tenders for construction were not issued until 1901.  There were a number of bidders but eventually all the tenders were granted to when the tenders were let to Hutchinson and Co of Embsay, Yorkshire.

Approval for opening from the Railway Inspectorate was granted in May 1905 and the line opened, initially to Ipstones, on 5 June 1905 and then on to Caldon Low quarry and Waterhouses on 1 July 1905.

Passenger services

North Staffordshire Railway
Scheduled passenger services were never intensive. A limited Sunday service was later introduced and by the outbreak of the First World War this pattern had become the norm. As a wartime measure, first class was withdrawn in 1918. After the war the service was downgraded even more, and by the end of the NSR period there were only two trains each way per day with one train each way on Sunday and an extra train each way on Wednesdays and Saturdays.

Excursion traffic was intermittent, through excursions direct from Stoke-on-Trent on Thursdays and weekends were a regular feature until the First World War but did not resume afterwards.

London, Midland and Scottish Railway
Under the 1923 Grouping the NSR became part of the London, Midland and Scottish Railway (LMS).  For the Waterhouses line this meant little change in the early days, but soon Sunday trains were discontinued and the extra Wednesday service to serve Leek market day was withdrawn.  The LMVLR closed in 1934 and the following year all passenger services over the line were withdrawn.

Freight traffic

Milk
The transport of milk and other produce from the farms of the Staffordshire Moorlands district was one of the prime reasons the line had been proposed by the Light Railway Committee.  From the opening of the line, the transport of milk was a significant contributor to the finances of the line.  Although much of the milk went to local destinations, the bulk of it went further afield and special milk trains ran from the branch to London for several years after the First World War.  The closure of the creamery at Ecton in 1932 resulted in a reorganisation by the dairy companies of the collection of milk in the district which led to the milk traffic being diverted away from the LMVLR and the Waterhouses branch which was a major factor in the decision to close the LMVLR in 1934.

Other freight
The carriage of other freight and general merchandise never met the levels the promoters of the line anticipated and one or two trains per day were sufficient to meet the demand.  After the withdrawal of the passenger services in 1935, freight traffic continued until 1964 when the goods facilities at Bradnop, Ipstones and Winkhill were withdrawn.

Mineral traffic
The transport of limestone mineral traffic from Caldon Low quarries was the main interest of the NSR in constructing the line as the company were the leaseholders of the quarry.  Daily services ran from the earliest days and reached a peak of 4 trains per day in 1927, but the economic depression of the 1930s affected the fortunes of Caldon Low quarry and the traffic had dropped to only one train per day in 1940.  After the end of the Second World War there was an increase in traffic and limestone continued to be moved by train from Caldon Low until 1988.

Resurgence

With the end of limestone traffic in 1988 the line went out of use, but was designated as a strategic freight site.  In 2009 Moorland and City Railways obtained the line on a 150yr lease from Network Rail with the intention of reopening the line for quarry traffic.  With a merger having taken place between Lafarge and Tarmac though, the future ownership of Caldon Low quarry is, in doubt and the plans for reopening the line for quarry traffic are on hold.

In 2014 MCR started the process to upgrade the track, as the current condition of the track will not support modern freight engines and rolling stock, and so the rails have been lifted between Ipstones and Caldon Low quarry with the intention of relaying with new track once the situation over the quarry is known.

 the Churnet Valley Railway are raising funds to purchase the trackwork between Leek Brook and Ipstones, in order to ensure their operations are not affected by the ongoing uncertainty over the quarry project.

Notes

References
 
 
 

Railway lines opened in 1905
North Staffordshire Railway
Staffordshire Moorlands
1905 establishments in England